Jasmine Marie Villegas, known professionally as Jasmine V, is an American singer. She was signed to Damon Dash's Dame Dash Music Group at the age of 12 and RCA Records at the age of 16 before signing to Interscope Records and Ester Dean's Eye Know a Secret (E.K.A.S.) Records.

Career
At the age of nine, Villegas appeared in a commercial for the animated feature The Land Before Time IX. and her first professional singing performance at age 11, performing the national anthem at a Los Angeles Clippers game. Later that year, she signed a record contract with Damon Dash's Dame Dash Music Group and worked extensively on a debut that was slated to feature collaborations from label-mate and former Missy Elliott protégée, Nicole Wray. When she was 16, she then signed with RCA Records, and appeared in Justin Bieber's music video for his single "Baby", as his love interest in the video. She later joined Bieber on the second part of his My World Tour as well as at the Kids' Choice Awards. She also appeared in the Sean Kingston and Bieber music video for Eenie Meenie. Villegas has also written with musician Nick Jonas.

In 2013, Villegas signed with Interscope Records and Ester Dean's Eye Know a Secret (E.K.A.S.) Records. She later appeared alongside American rapper Becky G, on the cover of Latina magazine's February 2014 issue.

Her single, "That's Me Right There" featuring Kendrick Lamar debuted August 5, 2014, and rose to No. 39 on the Billboard Twitter Top Tracks chart. Her debut EP was released on November 10, of that year. On March 11, 2015, Villegas released a new single called "One Night" featuring Problem and Jeremih. The song samples "Kiss Of Life" by Sade. On May 3, 2015, Villegas released the first installment in her songbook series (books inspired by her life and songs), co-written with R.W. Thomas. On June 8, 2015, Jasmine released a Spanish single titled "Renegades".

Personal life
Villegas is of Filipino and Mexican descent. She has three brothers, Robert Villegas, Jream Andrew Sablan (a.k.a. Jdrew, Jream Andrew), and Justin Villegas. Her parents separated when she was a young girl. Her grandmother, Sofia Vales, was the one who got her started into modeling at the young age of six. Jasmine started out doing beauty pageant contests.

Villegas dated Justin Bieber from 2009 to 2010.

In 2014, Villegas began dating Youtuber Ronnie Banks after he appeared in her music video for the single "That's Me Right There." On November 2, 2015, Villegas announced via Twitter that she was expecting her first child with Banks. On February 19, 2016, she gave birth to their daughter. Villegas got engaged to Banks in December 2016, later the engagement was broken off. On May 17, 2020, Villegas had a son with her boyfriend Omar Amir.

Discography

Extended plays

Mixtapes

Singles

As lead artist

As featured artist 
 2011: Why Can't We Be Friends? (Sean Kingston feat. Jasmine V)
 2011: Hello (Ryan Leslie feat. Jasmine Villegas)
 2013: Now Is The Time (Wally Lopez feat. Jasmine V)
 2015: Get It On [Remix] (Ap The Great feat. Jasmine V, K Camp)
 2017: The Chase [Interlude] (ITSG3! feat. Jasmine Villegas)
 2019: Hold Me Down (Prince Sole feat. Jasmine V)

Filmography

Guest starring appearances

Music video appearances

References

External links
 
 

1993 births
21st-century American actresses
Actresses from California
American child actresses
American child singers
American women pop singers
Place of birth missing (living people)
American television actresses
Child pop musicians
Living people
Actresses from San Jose, California
Singers from California
Musicians from San Jose, California
American contemporary R&B singers
American musicians of Mexican descent
Interscope Records artists
American hip hop singers
American women hip hop musicians
American actresses of Mexican descent
Hispanic and Latino American women singers
Hispanic and Latino American musicians
21st-century American singers
21st-century American women singers